Dakota Territory's at-large congressional district is an obsolete congressional district that encompassed the entire Dakota Territory prior to admission to the Union.  The district elected a delegate to the United States Congress.

From 1861 to 1889, Dakota Territory (which later became the states of North Dakota, South Dakota, and Montana, and parts of Idaho, Wyoming, and Nebraska) sent a single non-voting Delegate to the United States House of Representatives.

Over time, parts of the Territory were divided into Idaho Territory, Wyoming Territory, and Nebraska Territory.  On November 2, 1889, the remaining Territory was split between the new states of North Dakota and South Dakota.

List of delegates representing the district

References 
 

Former congressional districts of the United States
Territory
Territory
At-large United States congressional districts
Constituencies established in 1861
1861 establishments in Dakota Territory
Constituencies disestablished in 1889
1889 disestablishments in Dakota Territory